Maria Nicotra Fiorini (6 July 1913 – 14 July 2007) was an Italian politician. She was elected to the Constituent Assembly in 1946 as one of the first group of women parliamentarians in Italy. She subsequently served in the Chamber of Deputies from 1948 to 1953 and was later the first female president of a professional football club in Italy.

Biography
Nicotra was born in Catania in 1913 to Irene Fiorini and Sebastiano Nicotra. She became a member of the Catania branch of Azione Cattolica and during World War II served as a nurse, winning a gold medal for valour in nursing. In 1944 she joined the women's commission of the Christian Associations of Italian Workers.

Following the war, Nicotra was a Christian Democracy candidate in the June 1946 general elections, in which she was one of 21 women elected to the Constituent Assembly. Despite never speaking in the Assembly, she was elected to the Chamber of Deputies in 1948, serving until the 1953 elections. She remained involved in the women's section of the Christian Democracy and chaired the Catania autonomous public housing body between 1960 and 1965. She married , who she had met in 1955. After Verzotto moved abroad, she replaced him as president of Siracusa Calcio, the first woman in Italy to become president of a professional football club. When Verzotto returned to Italy and settled in Padua, Nicotra joined him. She died in the city in 2007.

References

1913 births
Politicians from Catania
Italian nurses
Italian women nurses
Christian Democracy (Italy) politicians
Members of the Constituent Assembly of Italy
Members of the Chamber of Deputies (Italy)
Italian football chairmen and investors
A.S. Siracusa
2007 deaths
20th-century Italian women politicians
Women members of the Chamber of Deputies (Italy)